High Steaks is a Tom and Jerry animated short film, released on March 23, 1962. It was the fourth of the thirteen cartoons in the series to be directed by Gene Deitch and produced by William L. Snyder in Czechoslovakia. The short's title is a pun on the phrase "High stakes".

Plot
Tom's owner is grilling steaks in his backyard. The steak's scent reaches Jerry, who is aroused by it and is led to the steak. He then tries to eat it but is captured by Tom, who uses his grill fork to catapult him back into the house. Jerry then returns to retrieve the steak and encounters Tom once more. Tom and Jerry battle it out with steak prongs. Tom tries to charge at Jerry with the prong he had, but Jerry dodges it quickly, causing Tom to accidentally stab the owner's rear end, causing him to leap in pain. After Tom nervously salutes the owner, he angrily sears Tom's head as flat as a waffle with a hot girdle.

Jerry next hides in a shuttlecock and tries to sneak onto the table, but Tom hits him with a racket. The shuttlecock gets caught in the net and rebounds into the owner's mouth. Angry and red-faced, he breaks the racket over Tom's head and walks away. The racket flips over for a few seconds to hit him again. Tom then tries to stop Jerry from opening a freshly shaken bottle of Kooky Kola (which is a pun on the soda, Coca-Cola) but he is too late; the soda ruins one of his owner's steaks, so Tom gets punished by gulping down another bottle of Kooky Kola and swallowing it making Tom look like a bottle much to Jerry's humor.

Once Tom recovers, he chases Jerry across the yard only to get distracted by the smell of steak on the grill. Jerry secretly put Tom's tail on the grill and his tail is now trapped in the grill. Tom tried to pull it out but the pain causes him to run out with his tail hooked on the grill, and knock his owner along with his steak and the bowl of salad flies in the air. Tom dives into the swimming pool to cool off, but when he tries to get out he goes back in the water due to the grill's weight. The owner, already tired too much of many problems with Tom, fishes him out of the pool and clobbers him off-screen while Jerry hides under the picnic table and covered his eyes with his hat. After the clobbering is done, Jerry sees the owner then tie Tom to a lounge chair so Tom stays out of trouble. Jerry hooks the chair to the rear bumper of a passing car at a stop light on the intersection of Deitch Drive and Snyder Street just before the car drives away, taking Tom and the chair with it, and dances victoriously with utmost pride. Ironically, Jerry's Machiavellian move would invariably serve Tom well, as he would receive a much kinder owner since his current owner is unlikely to bother finding him, considering how he views him as hardly more than a pest at this point. Finally, Tom's former owner goes back to his grilling in peace, and Jerry reaches the table and starts eating one of the steaks.

Cast
 Allen Swift as Tom's owner

References

External links
 
 

1961 animated films
Films directed by Gene Deitch
Tom and Jerry short films
1960s American animated films
1962 comedy films
1962 films
1962 short films
Metro-Goldwyn-Mayer short films
Metro-Goldwyn-Mayer animated short films
Rembrandt Films short films
Animated films without speech
1960s English-language films